The Minister for Finances is a position in the Government Council of the Grand Duchy of Luxembourg.  Among other competences, the Minister for Finances is responsible for overseeing the public finances, including the budget.

The position of Minister for Finances has been in continuous existence since the promulgation of Luxembourg's first constitution, in 1848.

Since 24 March 1936, the title of Minister for Finances has been an official one, although the position had been unofficially known by that name since its creation.  From the position's creation until 28 November 1857, the Minister went by the title of Administrator-General.  From 1857 until 1936, the Minister went by the title of Director-General.

List of Ministers for Finances

Footnotes

References
 
  

 List
Finances, Minister for